The Shaw Rocket Fund is a non-profit organization that funds both English and French Canadian children's television and digital programs. Headquartered in Calgary, Alberta, it is the largest private funder for Canadian kids' media for independent producers, and is one of Shaw Communications' key programs.

History 
The Shaw Rocket Fund was created in 1998 (known then as the Shaw Television Broadcast Fund) by Shaw Communications as a private funder of Canadian kids' TV production. In 2004, Agnes Augustin became President & CEO of the Fund. Agnes was previously a Manager and Vice President of Business Affairs for production and distribution companies, Head of Production for CMT, and an independent producer.

Shaw Communications continues to contribute to the Shaw Rocket Fund (over $200 million as of 2019), and the Shaw Rocket Fund has invested over $245 million into 1,003 programs of Canadian kids' content.

The Shaw Rocket Fund is listed as a Certified Independent Production Fund by the Canadian Radio-television and Telecommunications Commission (CRTC).

Board 
The Shaw Rocket Fund Board consists of five industry professionals. 
 Chair: Christine Shipton, former Senior Vice President of Content for Shaw Media
 Vice-Chair: Gigi Boyd, a Gemini and Leo award winning Producer ("Elijah")
 Secretary/Treasurer: Agnes Augustin, Shaw Rocket Fund President & CEO
 Director: Chethan Lakshman, Vice-President, External Affairs at Shaw Communications
 Director: Nancy Birnbaum, former CEO of Invest in Kids

Shaw Rocket Prize 
The Shaw Rocket Fund created the Shaw Rocket Prize in 2004 as a way to award high-quality Canadian children's programs.

The Shaw Rocket Prize was an annual award, funded by the Shaw Rocket Fund, presented to one or more Canadian television programs. It started out as one $50,000 prize, awarded to the winning program, but in 2013 it expanded to three $25,000 prizes, awarded to a winner in each of three categories (Preschool, Children ages 6–12 and Youth ages 13–17 & Family). Production companies applied for the Prize by submitting their programs online. Eligible entries are reviewed by an International Jury, made up of four to five industry professionals. Once the jury selected the finalists, another jury, made up of Canadian children, voted online for the winner. Global TV did a segment on the winners in 2014. Prime Minister Justin Trudeau and Sophie Grégoire-Trudeau introduced the 2016 winner event with a video message.

International Jury

Kids' Jury 
The Shaw Rocket Prize Kids' Jury was made up of children from across Canada. Over the years it evolved, originally beginning with a few select schools, and expanding to include children from all of Canada in the 0-17 age group. Preschoolers 5 and under screened and vote for one of three programs suitable for their age group, as did children aged 6–12 and youth aged 13–17.

Nominees 
Winners in bold

Winners

International Emmy Kids Awards 
The International Emmy Kids Awards is an annual event in February that recognizes the best in kids' programming around the world. The Shaw Rocket Fund was a presenting partner for five years beginning in 2013.

External links

References 

Shaw Communications
Television organizations in Canada